Rosa Giacinta Badalla (ca. 1660 – ca. 1710) was an Italian composer from the Milan area and Benedictine nun. The first record of her is in the lists of the monastery of Saint Radegonda in Milan from 1678. Claudia Sessa, Claudia Rusca, and Chiara Margarita Cozzolani were also active at Milanese convents during the same period.

She had only one printed collection, Motetti a voce sola (1684, Venice), a book of solo motets. Kendrick identifies it as "remarkable among Milanese solo motet books…for its patent vocal viruosity, motivic originality and self-assured compositional technique".

There are also two surviving secular cantatas, Vuò cercando (ca. 1680) and O fronde care (ca 1695), to which Badalla also wrote the text.

References

The Norton/Grove Dictionary of Women Composers, edited by Julie Anne Sadie and Rhian Samuel. "Rosa Giacinta Badalla" Robert L. Kendrick, pg. 32, Norton and Company, New York and London, 1995.

Notes

Further reading 

 Free scores by Rosa Giacinta Badalla at the International Music Score Library Project 
 Free scores by Rosa Giacinta Badalla at the Choral Public Domain Library

Italian Baroque composers
Italian women classical composers
Benedictine nuns
1660s births
1710s deaths
18th-century Italian composers
18th-century Italian women
18th-century women composers